Aaron Gerow is an American historian of Japanese cinema, and a member of the faculty of Yale University where he holds a joint position between the Department of East Asian Languages and Literatures and the Film Studies Programs.

Education
Gerow received both an AB (1985) and MFA (1987) in film studies from Columbia University. After this he moved to the University of Iowa, where he attained an M.A. (1991) in Asian Civilizations, followed by a Ph.D (1996) in Communications Studies.

Career
Gerow started his career in Japan as a critic and a film festival programmer. He still contributes to the ten best film poll for the magazine Eiga Geijutsu. He spent over a decade working for the Yamagata International Documentary Film Festival. He helped found its influential Asia Program, which played a critical role in the development of independent documentary in the region. Gerow spent 12 years in Japan, teaching at Yokohama National University and Meiji Gakuin University, before moving to Yale University. He was one of the founders of the Japanese film research collective Kinema Club in the early 1990s, and currently serves as editor of its editorial collective. His reviews have long been published in The Daily Yomiuri, a national English language daily published in English by one of Japan’s largest newspapers, the Yomiuri Shimbun.

Gerow's scholarship is diverse. A theoretically informed approach to history, it covers over a century of film history and many different genres. His books include a single-film analysis (on A Page of Madness), a director study (Kitano Takeshi), a study of early cinema, and a research guide co-wrote with Abé Mark Nornes. He is editor or co-editor of several books, notably a collection of essays by the Japanese film scholar and collector Makino Mamoru and a special issue of the Review of Japanese Culture and Society entitled "Decentering Theory: Reconsidering the History of Japanese Film Theory." He has been published in diverse outlets such as the Asia-Pacific Journal. His work is often cited in academic writing.

Gerow's most influential work is Visions of Japanese modernity. Previous histories of prewar Japanese cinema tend to focus either on the influence of traditional culture on cinema (most notably Noel Burch's To the Distant Observer), or the impact of western modernity on the local film culture. Instead, Gerow carefully examines the struggles of defining the medium in this time of flux, particularly those around the Pure Film Movement of the 1910s. With few extant films to analyze, Gerow offers a rich and innovative look at early film criticism and theory, exhibition practices such as the benshi and censorship laws. In a published book review in the University of Southern California film journal Spectator, media scholar Annie Manion wrote "Aaron Gerow’s influence and importance in the field of Japanese film and media studies cannot be overstated."

Selected works

References

External links
Aaron Gerow's website has an informative blog and links to many of his online writings and interviews

Year of birth missing (living people)
Living people
Yale University faculty
Columbia University School of the Arts alumni
University of Iowa alumni
21st-century American historians
American male non-fiction writers
21st-century American male writers
Academic staff of Yokohama National University
Columbia College (New York) alumni